The following is a timeline of history of the city of Bydgoszcz, Poland.

Prior to 20th century

1037–1053 – Fortified stronghold built.
1346 – Bydgoszcz granted city rights by King Casimir III the Great.
1520 – Sejm of the Kingdom of Poland held in Bydgoszcz.
1557 – Bernardine Church completed.
1594 – Mint established.
1619 – Jesuit school, present day High School No. 1, founded.
1645 – Poor Clares' Church completed.
1657 – Treaty of Bydgoszcz signed.
1764 – Bydgoszcz became one of three seats of the Crown Tribunal for the Greater Poland Province after the Convocation Sejm of 1764.
1767 – Józef Wybicki, author of the lyrics of the national anthem of Poland, works at the Crown Tribunal in Bydgoszcz.
1772 – Bydgoszcz annexed by Prussia in the First Partition of Poland.
1794 – City recaptured by Poles led by General Jan Henryk Dąbrowski during the Kościuszko Uprising.
1807 – Bydgoszcz becomes part of the Duchy of Warsaw
1815 – Bydgoszcz re-annexed by Prussia.
1864 – National Bank of Poland building completed.
1871 – City becomes part of the German Empire.
1872 – Special educational centre for blind children founded.
1899 – Main Post Office completed.

20th century

1901–1939
1906 – Municipal Market Hall and Copernicanum building completed.
1908 – Population: 57,696.
1919 – Bydgoszcz restored to Poland after the country regained independence.
1920 – Polonia Bydgoszcz football club (future multi-sports club) founded.
1923 – Regional Museum in Bydgoszcz founded.
1929 – City hosts the 1929 European Rowing Championships.
1930 – Botanic Garden of Casimir the Great University founded as the Municipal Botanic Garden.

World War II (1939–1945)

1939
 September: City is occupied by Nazi Germany.
 3 September: German diversion, resulting in Polish-German skirmishes, which were referred to as the Bloody Sunday by propaganda of Nazi Germany to serve as an excuse for planned German massacres of Polish residents.
 3–10 September: Germans massacred 192 Poles in the city.
 September: Einsatzgruppe IV, Einsatzkommando 16 and SS-Totenkopf-Standarte "Brandenburg" Nazi paramilitary death squads entered the city.
 10 September: Germans carried out mass searches of houses throughout the city.
 24 September: Appointed German Kreisleiter called local Polish city officials to a supposed formal meeting in the city hall, from where they were taken to a nearby forest and exterminated. He also ordered the execution of their family members to "avoid creating martyrs".
 September: Nazi prison and forced labour camp established by the Germans at Wały Jagiellońskie Street.
 22, 29 September: Massacres of 250 Polish activists previously imprisoned in a local Selbstschutz prison during the Intelligenzaktion.
 30 September: Over 3,000 Poles imprisoned by the Germans in the city as of 30 September.
 Early October: Further mass arrests of over 2,000 Poles.
 18–20 October: Further mass arrests of nearly 1,500 Poles, incl. activists and teachers, carried out by the German police, Einsatzkommando 16 and Selbstschutz.
 October–November: Large massacres of Poles and Jews carried out by the Germans in the Valley of Death.
 1 November: City unilaterally annexed by Germany.
 11 November: Further mass arrests of 3,800 Poles carried out by the German police and Selbstschutz.
 11 November: Public execution of pre-war Polish mayor Leon Barciszewski by the Germans.
 17 November: Commander of the local SD-EK unit declared there was no more Polish intelligentsia capable of resistance in the city.
 November: Einsatzgruppen-operated penal camp established in the Jachcice district.
 Massacres of over 1,400 Poles from Bydgoszcz, incl. teachers, activists, priests, old people, boy and girl scouts, gymnasium students, and children as young as 12, in the nearby village of Tryszczyn.
1940 – January: Poles from Bydgoszcz among the victims of a massacre perpetrated by the Selbstschutz in Jastrzębie.
1941
 4 February: First mass transport of 524 Poles sent from Bydgoszcz to the Potulice concentration camp.
 May: Forced labour camp established by the Germans in the Smukała Dolna district.
1943
 March: Rescue of some kidnapped Polish children from the Zamość region by local Poles.
 The local Polish resistance movement sheltered British prisoners of war who escaped from the German Stalag XX-A POW camp, and facilitated their escapes to neutral Sweden.
1944 – Bromberg-Ost subcamp of the Stutthof concentration camp established by the Germans.
1945 – End of German occupation, Bydgoszcz restored to Poland.

1945–2000
1949 – Polish Theatre in Bydgoszcz completed.
1951 – Bydgoszcz University of Science and Technology founded.
1955 – Polonia Bydgoszcz wins its first Team Speedway Polish Championship.
1969 – Kazimierz Wielki University in Bydgoszcz founded.
1978 – Andrzej Szwalbe Collection of Historical Pianos founded by Andrzej Szwalbe.
1981 – Bydgoszcz events.
1984 – Nicolaus Copernicus University Ludwik Rydygier Collegium Medicum in Bydgoszcz founded.
1993 – Pałac Bydgoszcz wins its first Polish women's volleyball championship.
2000 – Andrzej Szwalbe Collection of Historical Pianos relocated from Bydgoszcz to the Palaces and park ensemble in Ostromecko.

21st century

2004
 24 February: Roman Catholic Diocese of Bydgoszcz established.
 31 March: NATO Joint Force Training Centre founded.
2005 – Marian Rejewski monument unveiled on the 100th anniversary of his birth.
2006 – Opera Nova Bydgoszcz completed.
2007 – Andrzej Szwalbe monument unveiled.
2009
 September: City co-hosts the EuroBasket 2009.
 September–October: City co-hosts the 2009 Women's European Volleyball Championship.
2010 – City hosts the 2010 IAAF World Cross Country Championships.
2011
 June–July: City co-hosts the EuroBasket Women 2011.
 7 July: Exploseum founded.
2013 – City hosts the 2013 IAAF World Cross Country Championships.
2017 – City co-hosts the 2017 UEFA European Under-21 Championship.
2019
 May–June: City co-hosts the 2019 FIFA U-20 World Cup.
 24 October: Monument to the Wisła Detachment of the Polish Navy, which fought in the area against the German invasion of 1939, unveiled.

See also
 Bydgoszcz history
 
 List of presidents of Bydgoszcz
 Other names of Bydgoszcz e.g. Bromberg

References

Bibliography

External links
 http://www.bydgoszcz.pl/ (Polish)
 http://www.visitbydgoszcz.pl/ (Polish, English)
Municipal website  
Wirtualna Bydgoszcz – informator bydgoski  
Bydgoszcz news  
  
Evangelical – Augsburg (Lutheran) Parish in Bydgoszcz  
Foto Galeria Bydgoska – foto.bydgoszcz.pl 

Bydgoszcz
Bydgoszcz
Years in Poland
History of Bydgoszcz